The men's 3000 metres event at the 1975 European Athletics Indoor Championships was held on 9 March in Katowice.

Results

References

3000 metres at the European Athletics Indoor Championships
3000